Irek Zaripov (born March 27, 1983) is a Russian biathlete and cross-country skier.

He was born on March 27, 1983, in Sterlitamak, USSR.

He lost his legs in a car accident in 2000. He started to practice skiing in 2005.

He competed at the 2010 Winter Paralympics where he won five medals: two gold and one silver in cross country skiing, and two gold medals in biathlon.

He has a son named Aynur.

References

External links
 Irek Zaripov Profile  at the official website of the International Paralympic Committee (IPC)

Bashkir people
1983 births
Living people
People from Sterlitamak
Paralympic gold medalists for Russia
Paralympic biathletes of Russia
Paralympic cross-country skiers of Russia
Biathletes at the 2010 Winter Paralympics
Cross-country skiers at the 2010 Winter Paralympics
Biathletes at the 2014 Winter Paralympics
Medalists at the 2010 Winter Paralympics
Medalists at the 2014 Winter Paralympics
Paralympic silver medalists for Russia
Russian male biathletes
Paralympic medalists in cross-country skiing
Paralympic medalists in biathlon